Mahmudabad (also Romanized as Maḩmūdābād; also known  as Bīāb, Maḩmūdābād-e Bīāb, and Maḩmūdābād-e Bī Āb) is a village in Hendudur Rural District, Sarband District, Shazand County, Markazi Province, Iran. At the 2006 census, its population was 74, in 16 families.

References 

Populated places in Shazand County